Prisca Singamo (born 2 January 1976) is a Malawian former middle-distance runner.

Prisca competed in the women's 800 metres at the 1992 Summer Olympics in Barcelona. She finished seventh in heat three and failed to qualify for the semi-finals.

References

Malawian female middle-distance runners
1976 births
Living people
Olympic athletes of Malawi
Athletes (track and field) at the 1992 Summer Olympics